Rumen Georgiev Radev (born 18 June 1963) is a Bulgarian politician and former major general who is the current president of Bulgaria since 22 January 2017. 

Radev previously served as higher commander of the Bulgarian Air Force. He won the 2016 presidential election, as an independent candidate supported by the Bulgarian Socialist Party, defeating GERB candidate Tsetska Tsacheva in the second round. He won a second consecutive term in the 2021 election, with 66% of the vote in the second round.

Biography
Radev was born on 18 June 1963 in Dimitrovgrad, Bulgaria. His family is from Slavyanovo in the Haskovo region. In 1982 he graduated from the Mathematical School in Haskovo with a gold medal. He graduated from the Georgi Benkovski Bulgarian Air Force University in 1987 as the top graduate. In 1992, he graduated from the US Air Force Squadron Officer School at Maxwell AFB. From 1994 to 1996, he studied at the Rakovski Defence and Staff College, where he was also the top graduate. He holds a Doctor of Military Sciences degree in the field of improvement of tactical training of flight crews and simulation of air combat.

In 2003 he graduated from Air War College or Air University at Maxwell AFB in the United States with a Master of Strategic Studies with honors.

Presidency
In August 2016, the opposition Bulgarian Socialist Party and the Alternative for Bulgarian Revival (ABR) officially nominated Radev as a candidate for the November 2016 presidential election. In the same month, ABR withdrew its presidential nomination of General Radev in favour of Ivaylo Kalfin.

In the first round of the election, conducted on 6 November 2016, Radev came first with 25.44% of the vote. He faced GERB candidate Tsetska Tsacheva in the runoff the following Sunday 13 November. He defeated her, winning 59.37% of the popular vote.

On 1 February 2021, he officially announced that he and Iliana Yotova would run for a second term. The presidential election happened on 14 November 2021. Prior to the election, several parties declared their support for Radev, including ITN, PP and BSPzB. Radev received 1,322,385 votes in the first round, alongside his running partner Iliana Yotova, 49.42% of the vote. This led to a second round run-off with the GERB-supported candidate Anastas Gerdzhikov, who got 22.83% of the vote in the first round. Radev won in the run-off, with 66.7% of the vote, starting his second term as president.

Rivalry with Prime Minister Borisov 

Since his election into office, Radev has frequently criticised Bulgarian Prime Minister Boyko Borisov, whom Radev views as permitting corruption through a 'reckless leadership style', as well as attempting to strangle his political opposition. This led Radev to frequently veto legislative proposals submitted by Borisov's GERB party to Bulgarian Parliament, issuing a total of 19 vetoes in this first two and a half years of his presidency. Borisov, on the other hand, often accused Radev of 'sabotaging the government's work', as well as supporting the opposition Socialist Party during campaign periods.

In his 2019 New Year's address to the Bulgarian People, broadcast on almost all Bulgarian TV channels, Radev stated that he believed that Borisov's Government had failed in addressing corruption, placed the country in economic stagnation with price increases and low wages, undermined the fairness of elections, as well as 'retreated' from law and justice.

F-16 deal veto 
In June 2019, Radev vetoed a major government contract for the acquisition of several F-16 Fighting Falcons from the United States at a cost of around 2bln lev. Radev strongly criticised the deal, accusing the government of authoritarianism and stated that he believed it had agreed to downgrades in the jets' avionics and armament, in order to get a lower purchasing price, which he also deemed too high for what they are worth. He added, that as a former pilot and airforce commander, he didn't believe that the deal was in Bulgaria's best interests. The pro-government majority in Bulgaria's national assembly overruled Radev's veto and the deal was nonetheless concluded.

Rejection of Geshev as General Prosecutor 
In November 2019, Radev refused to sign the decree appointing Ivan Geshev to the post of Chief Public Prosecutor of Bulgaria, following the latter's election to the post by Bulgaria's Supreme Judicial Council. He did not officially declare the motive for his refusal in written form, instead deciding to explain it personally to the media. Radev remarked that Geshev was the only candidate for the post and opined that the single-candidate nature of his election was supported by Borisov's government. He expressed the opinion that Geshev's candidacy had been supported only by government-controlled institutions and not by civic ones, which in his eyes led to a lack of public confidence in the institution. The Supreme Judicial Council refused to revise their decision and voted in favour of Geshev a second time, which triggered a constitutional requirement for Radev as president to sign the decree. Stating that he would refuse to violate the constitution, Radev did so following a meeting with Geshev, but called for changes to Bulgaria's constitution.

Wiretapping scandal 
The relations between Radev and the newly appointed general prosecutor quickly soured, as Geshev released what he stated was a wiretap of Radev discussing his involvement in alleged criminal activities. Geshev further appealed to the Constitutional Court of Bulgaria to have Radev's legal immunity revoked. The general prosecutor's actions backfired in the eyes of the Bulgarian people and were widely viewed as an attempt to suppress and censor the president – either as 'revenge' for the president's initial veto of Geshev's appointment, or as a preparation for a move to remove Radev from his post as president. In response, Radev accused Geshev's prosecution of being controlled by Borisov's government, whom he accused of using both the prosecution, the secret services and the National Police Service to crush dissent.

Borisov swore that he had not ordered Radev to be wiretapped, but Radev doubled down – noting that the agency responsible for wiretapping in Bulgaria, the State Agency for National Security, was directly responsible to the government and the prime minister. He further questioned the motives as to why it appeared to him as though the general prosecutor "saw crime and corruption in everything, except for the council of ministers".

Declaration of no confidence 
On 4 February 2020, Radev announced that he had formally withdrawn confidence in Borisov's government. He pointed out that there was, in his opinion, a strong crisis in the governance of all levels, a lack of will to reform and fight corruption, and a state of morally-questionable lawlessness in the country. Borisov accused Radev of trying to "take over" the country and stated that his government did not depend on Radev for confidence, adding that he believed the presidency to be a useless post, holding only 'symbolic councils', which he asserted never decided anything.

The continuing conflict between the prior PM and the now president Radev
After the start of the COVID-19 pandemic in Bulgaria, Radev and Borisov's government initially appeared to thaw their relations for the sake of national unity during a time of crisis. This détente, however, was not to last – the two entered into another conflict shortly thereafter, with Radev partially vetoing a law passed by the Bulgarian government imposing additional measures in relation to the coronavirus pandemic. Radev objected to a paragraph criminalizing the spread of "fake news" with a fine of up to 5,000 euros. Surprisingly, Radev also vetoed a paragraph added on the insistence of the Bulgarian Socialist Party, which was supposed to impose price controls on essential goods. The veto sparked anger in Borisov, who accused Radev of populism and political opportunism. Despite this, Borisov ordered his parliamentary group to accept the veto on the two paragraphs – removing both the fake news fine and the socialist-added price control paragraphs from the final version of the law. The amended bill, however, still featured a paragraph which obligated telecom providers to track and store their user's data for up to 6 months and provide it upon request of the authorities, with the stated goal of tracking the movements of quarantined citizens.

The two continued to clash over the coming days, with Radev frequently criticising the government for its handling of the state of emergency and accusing it of quote mining the World Health Organization for political gains. In reply, Borisov accused Radev of sabotaging the state of emergency and compared Radev to a "dirty old hag of a mother-in-law, the nasty kind", expressing bewilderment at "how Radev was able to make [political] inflammatory statements on the day, in which his own [Radev's] father had passed away". Radev concluded, however, that the conflict was "only in Borisov's head", stating that he had never called for the state of the emergency to be lifted and merely disagreed with the government's handling of it. In October 2020, Radev attended an investment forum in Estonia, but his visit was cut short after it was revealed that he had been exposed to a COVID-19 positive individual while in Bulgaria. Some sources alleged that Radev had been aware of that prior to travelling, while the president accused political opponents of deliberately orchestrating a campaign against him in order to tarnish his image, displaying a negative PCR test he had obtained prior to his official trip.

Borisov photo scandal and drone controversy 
In June 2020, photographs emerged that purported to show what appeared to be Prime Minister Borisov lying half-naked on a bed, next to a nightstand featuring a handgun and stacks of euro banknotes. Borisov confirmed that the room in which the photos were taken was his, but denied the gun and money, stating that the images could have been manipulated. Borisov accused President Radev of flying a consumer drone into his residence in order to take the pictures. He also accused former Ombudswoman Maya Manolova, TV star Slavi Trifonov and his own former second in command Tsvetan Tsvetanov (who had just left and condemned the ruling party) of involvement in a plot to take photos of him while he was sleeping in a "KGB-Style" kompromat operation. Radev condemned the leaks and called it an "insane" invasion of the prime minister's privacy. He added that he owns a drone, but that the accusation that he personally piloted it into the prime minister's residence to take pictures was part of Borisov's "fantasy and paranoia".

Other

Arrest of advisors and anti-government protesters

In July 2020, agents of Chief Prosecutor Geshev entered the presidency and detained several of the president's advisors. This, alongside the photo scandal and an incident on a Burgas beach significantly impacted the credibility of Borisov's government, leading to the beginning of large-scale anti-government protests, which Radev openly supported. Radev made a televised address to the nation, in which he demanded that both the entire government and the chief prosecutor resign, openly calling them "mafia".

Foreign policy 
In February 2017, Radev condemned and called for an end to the EU sanctions against Russia, while at the same time describing the Annexation of Crimea by the Russian Federation as a "violation of international law".

On 17 March 2017, Radev condemned as 'absolutely unacceptable' what he described as a Turkish intervention in Bulgaria's 2017 parliamentary election after the Turkish ambassador to Bulgaria was found to have appeared in a campaign clip for one of Bulgaria's political parties and after Turkish Social Affairs minister was found to have agitated and offer incentives for Bulgarian Turks in Turkey to cross the border in an organized voting campaign and vote for the same party. Radev stated that he had referred the matter to the European Union. He met with Turkish President Recep Tayyip Erdoğan several months later in July, following which he described Turkey as an "important neighbour, partner and ally", while at the same time stating that this status hinged on Turkey's respect for Bulgaria's  "internal political process, regarding Bulgaria's political parties and electoral system". He also became the only EU head of state to attend Erdogan's inauguration, stating that his mandate was not given to him by either the European Commission or the Bulgarian Government, but by the Bulgarian people.

On 24 January 2018, Radev condemned the Turkish invasion of northern Syria aimed at ousting U.S.-backed Syrian Kurds from the enclave of Afrin, and insisted that the European Union should intervene to stop it.In April 2018, he criticised the 2018 missile strikes against Syria, instead calling for "less weapons and more dialogue".

In February 2019, Radev condemned the Bulgarian Government's recognition of Venezuelan opposition leader Juan Guaidó as interim president of Venezuela during the 2019 Venezuelan presidential crisis, adding that he believed the government had overstepped its authority in recognizing the opposition leader as interim president. Radev further criticised the EU's recognition of Guaido, urging both the country and the EU to remain neutral and refrain from recognizing Guaido, as he viewed such recognition as imposing an ultimatum, which he deemed would only aggravate the crisis in Venezuela.

In April 2022, Radev broke ranks with the Petkov Government, declaring that he is fully opposed to Bulgaria providing weapons to Ukraine in relation to Russia's invasion of the latter, characterizing it as a step towards the direct involvement of Bulgaria in the conflict and seeing it as contrary to the pursuit of a peaceful solution.

Approval ratings 
Radev has enjoyed positive approval ratings for the vast majority of his presidency. Having been elected with around 60% of the vote in the autumn 2016 election, he managed to keep that figure as his approval rating through to 2018.

His approval then rose to 67% by May 2018, before falling to around 56% by autumn 2019. It is noteworthy, however, that even after this fall in his popularity, he was still considered the most popular and approved of Bulgarian politician, as well as one of the only two Bulgarian politicians (the other being Maya Manolova) with a higher percentage of approval than disapproval.

By April 2020, Radev's approval ratings stood at about 49%. Radev began his second term as president with an approval rating of 58.5%, according to a Gallup poll.

Family and personal life
Radev joined the Bulgarian Communist Party in the 1980s. He later stated that his primary reason for joining the party had been so that he would be deployed to fly in a supersonic jet, but also added that he was not ashamed of his past and was proud of the things he did. He left the party in 1990, when a newly enacted law forbade members of the country's armed forces from being members of political parties. He has not been a member of any political parties since and his candidacy in the 2016 elections was supported by an independent initiative committee affiliated with the Bulgarian Socialist Party, rather than by a formal nomination by any party.

Radev has two children from his first marriage to Ginka Radeva, which ended in a divorce in 2014: a daughter Darina, born in 2001 and a son Georgi, born in 2003. He later married Desislava Gencheva, who was previously married to the BSP MP Georgi Svilenski. Apart from Bulgarian, Radev is also fluent in Russian, German and English. Radev's father died on 6 April 2020.

Military career

 1987 – 1989: Junior pilot in the 15th Fighter Aviation Regiment – Ravnets
 1989 – 1992: Unit deputy commander at the 15th Fighter Aviation Regiment – Ravnets
 1992 – 1997: Unit commander at the 15th Fighter Aviation Regiment – Ravnets
 1997 – 1999: MiG-29 squadron commander at the Fifth Fighter Airbase – Ravnets
 1999 – 2000: Deputy commander for flight preparation at the Fifth Fighter Airbase – Ravnets
 2000: Deputy commander for flight training at the Third Fighter Airbase – Graf Ignatievo
 2000 – Study of the Air defence of the Republic of Bulgaria – NATO, Brussels
 2000 – 2002: Chief of Staff of the Third Fighter Airbase – Graf Ignatievo
 2002 – 2004: Chief of Staff of the Third Fighter Airbase – Graf Ignatievo
 2004 – 2009: Commander of the Third Fighter Airbase – Graf Ignatievo
 2009 – 2014: Bulgarian Air Force deputy commander
 2014 – 2017: Bulgarian Air Force commander

Flight information
 Pilot 1st class.
 Flight experience of L-29, L-39 trainers and MiG-15UTI, MiG-17, MiG-21, MiG-29 fighter jets.
 Familiarization flights of the F-15, F-16, F/A-18 Hornet, Eurofighter Typhoon, SAAB Gripen, Dassault Rafale.
 Flown over 1400 hours.
 In 2014, he organized aviation show "This we are!" and personally performed the "Bell" and "Pugachev's Cobra" manoeuvres on a MiG-29.

Military ranks
 1987 – Lieutenant
 1989 – Senior lieutenant
 1994 – Captain
 1997 – Major
 1999 – Lieutenant colonel
 2002 – Colonel
 2007 – Brigadier general
 2014 – Major general
 2017 – General (Commander-In-Chief)

Awards
Rumen Radev was awarded numerous medals and prizes, including the sign "For loyal service under the flags" – III degree, and Honorary sign of the Ministry of Defence "Saint George" – II degree.

Honours

National honours
  : Grand Master of the Order of Stara Planina
  : Grand Master of the Order of Saints Cyril and Methodius
  : Grand Master of the Order of Civil Merit (Bulgaria)
  : Grand Master of the Order of Military Merit (Bulgaria)
  : Grand Master of the Order of the Madara Horseman

Foreign honours
 : Grand cross of the Order of the Redeemer (2017)
 : Companions of Honour of the National Order of Merit (5 February 2018)
: 
 Grand Cross of the Order of Aviz (30 January 2019)
 Grand Collar of the Order of Prince Henry (12 April 2022)
: Collar of the Order pro Merito Melitensi (13 December 2019)

References

External links
 

Radev, Rumen
Air War College alumni
Bulgarian Air Force personnel
Bulgarian aviators
Bulgarian generals
Presidents of Bulgaria
Living people
People from Dimitrovgrad, Bulgaria
Recipients of the Order pro Merito Melitensi
Squadron Officer School alumni
20th-century Bulgarian military personnel
21st-century Bulgarian military personnel